Yelahanka is a suburb of Bangalore in the Indian state of Karnataka and one of the zones of BBMP. It is the oldest part of present Municipal Bengaluru (Bangalore) city and is in the north of the city. It is Nadaprabhu Kempegowda I, of the Yelahanka Prabhu clans, who laid the foundation of present-day Bengaluru through the creation of a "mud fort town" in 1537 CE

History
The city of Yelahanka had been in existence prior to the 12th century. The region was called 'Ilaipakka Naadu' during the rule of Cholas. A stone tablet of 1267 A.D found in Doddaballapur mentions Dechi Devarasa, ruling the region with Yelahanka as his capital under the aegis of Hoysala monarch 'Narasimha (Third)'.

Later, during Hoysala rein, the city came to be known as 'Elavanka' and gradually shifted to 'Yelahanka'. It was also known as Elavank.

Of the numerous Rulers of different dynasties who ruled with Yelahanka as their Capital, the Kempe Gowdas are the most acclaimed. Hiriya Kempe Gowda (Kempe Gowda the First) built a fort in the adjoining village of Bengaluru and developed it as his new capital, probably due to its strategic location and slightly cooler climate being at a higher altitude. It was his son, Immadi Kempe Gowda, who had the famous watchtowers built in the four directions of the new city.

Some temples in Yelahanka—like the Venugopala Swamy Temple—have remained as a testimony to its rich past. Although a Fort's remnant could not be traced, a street nearby the Venugopala Swamy Temple is still known as 'Kote Beedi' or 'Fort Street'.

Modern Yelahanka
Yelahanka lies to the north of Bengaluru. It was a municipal council and taluk (lies below the district level in administrative setup) headquarters prior to the formation of BBMP (a metro corporation annexing the original Bangalore area and its suburbs) and now forms a part of Greater Bengaluru. A well-planned township was developed during the early 1980s to the north of the city by the Karnataka Housing Board and is identified by several names like 'Yelahanka Upanagara', 'Yelahanka Satellite Town', 'Yelahanka New Town' or simply 'Housing Board'. Yelahanka New Town is  far from Trifecta Esplanade, Belathur.

National Highway NH 44 passes through Yelahanka. The newly constructed Navayuga Devanahalli KIAL Expressway (Part of NH 44) also passes through the suburb and the northeastern fringes of Yelahanka, acting as a bypass road to avoid the Yelahanka suburb. State Highway 9 (Bangalore - Hindupur) passing in the south of Yelahanka bisects the suburb into Old Town and New Town. Yelahanka's business areas are Hospital Main Road and BB road in Yelahanka and New Town are 16th 'B' Cross and Mother Dairy Cross and Yelahanka New Town, fourth phase.

Yelahanka has several lakes surrounding it, adjoining: Old Yelahanka, Puttenahalli, Attur, Ananthapura, and Allalasandra. The lake at Puttenahalli ( up the SH 9) has been declared a bird sanctuary. Most of these are either dry or are in bad condition due to emptying of untreated sewerage effluents into them.

Yelahanka is on the verge of being the prime real estate hub in North Bengaluru owing to its vast undeveloped areas and easy access to the Kempegowda International Airport. Yelahanka has seen remarkable developments since its inception.

Most major retail brands have a presence in Yelahanka. Major ones include Yelahanka Central, RMZ Galleria Mall, and Dmart in Yelahanka New Town.

Geography
Due to its higher altitude from mean sea level, it is lush green and has pleasant weather year-round.
 The summer season lasts from March to mid-May, with temperatures ranging between 
 At the end of May, the monsoon season starts and lasts until the end of October. Yelahanka is served by both southwest as well as northeast monsoon.

Demographics
 India census, Yelahanka had a population of 93,263. Males constituted 54% of the population and females 46%. The literacy rate was 75%, higher than the national average of 59.5%: male literacy was 80%, and female literacy was 68%. Eleven percent of the population were under 6 years of age.

As per recent estimates, the population of Yelahanka has risen to about 300,000 in 2011.

Connectivity
Yelahanka has excellent connectivity be it road, rail, and air. The road network to Yelahanka is one of the best in entire Bangalore. Yelahanka railway station is one of the oldest stations setup in Bangalore area and has railway lines connecting KR Puram and Byapanahalli in the east and Yeshwanthpur in the northwest. If these tracks are improved and daily city passenger trains introduce, a big part of traffic congestion will be eased as more people will use trains. Since the tracks are already existing, it is better to use the existing infrastructure rather than investing in new activities like Metro. Kempegowda International Airport is located off Yelahanka.

Roadways
Yelahanka is connected with downtown Bangalore through a network of roads and a six-lane dual carriageway highway. The same highway connects Yelahanka with Kempegowda International Airport. BMTC (Bangalore Metropolitan Transport Corporation), KSRTC serves Yelahanka with its network of buses. There are regular BMTC Volvo A/C Bus services and other buses to Bangalore from Yelahanka.

National Highway 44 (North–South Corridor) also passes through Yelahanka.

Karnataka State Highway 9 starts at Yelahanka main road near Yelahanka traffic police station and ends near the Andhra Pradesh border near Vidurashwatha, where it continues as AP SH 472 until Hindupuram.

Yelahanka is also served by a host of private taxi companies operating in the Greater Bangalore area and also the Auto Rickshaw services within the Bangalore Metropolitan Area.

Rail

Yelahanka Jn. (code YNK) is a junction railway station of South Western Railway Zone, served by Indian Railways.

The station lies on the train line connecting Bangalore with North, West, and Central India via Guntakal Junction. There are four routes merging at the station - (south) one from Yeshwantpur (YPR) and the other from Byapanahalli – KR Puram (KJM). (north) one from Chikkballapur and the other from Doddballapur connecting all major cities in the country. All rail lines expect the one of from Chikkaballapur are fully electrified and double line.

The station is served by regularly scheduled train services originating, terminating, and passing through Bangalore Metropolitan region. The majority of express and passenger trains halt at Yelahanka Jn. station, connecting it to all major cities and towns in the country. There are passenger train services that connect Yelahanka Jn. to nearby towns and other suburbs of Bangalore.

Yelahanka Jn. has a computerized Indian Railway ticket booking office.

Rail Wheel Factory (earlier known as Wheel and Axle Plant) is situated in Yelahanka. It is a state-of-the-art plant, meeting the bulk of the requirement of wheels, axles, and wheel sets for the Indian Railways. The spare capacity available is profitably utilized to meet the domestic demands for non-railway customers and exports.

Administration
 The Yelahanka Vidhan Sabha constituency is repreresented by S R Vishwanath since 2008. 
 The authority responsible for the upkeep of Yelahanka is BBMP (Bruhat Bengaluru Mahanagara Palike).
 There are two police stations within Yelahanka, one in Yelahanka and the other in Yelahanka New town and One Traffic police Station in Yelahanka.
 Yelahanka has its own RTO KA-50, located at Singanayakanahalli.
 Yelahanka has its own Sub-Registrar office at NES Office inside Mini Soudha Building.
 Yelahanka has two BMTC depots – depots 11 & 30 located at Puttenahalli.
 Yelahanka is the headquarters of Yelahanka Zone, Yelahanka division, Yelahanka sub-division and Yelahanka Ward

Industries 
 Yelahanka is a traditional place of weavers. The silk handloom has been the lifeline of Yelahanka people for over 2 centuries, and even now in areas like Kamakshamma layout, Agrahara layout, Kogilu, Maruti nagar, and Chowdeshwari layout silk saree development can be seen. And saree products are being marketed over here.
 Yelahanka has the largest milk dairy of Karnataka State, known as 'Mother Dairy', a processing unit of the state run Karnataka Milk Federation (KMF) www.kmfnandini.coop/.
 Yelahanka houses the Rail Wheel Factory (formerly Wheel and Axle Plant), a Production Unit of Indian Railways. It is the largest manufacturer of Railway Wheels and Axles and was until recently, also the proprietary manufacturer of these products in India (save the Durgapur Steel Plant, which produces a small quantity of Railway Wheels).
 Other industry includes Astra Zeneca Pharmaceuticals, Esanosys Technologies, Federal-Mogul Goetze (India) Limited (formerly Escorts Mahle Goetze), Ranflex India Pvt. Ltd. Hobel Flexibles Inc & Sri Pradhyumna Technologies Pvt. Ltd. Leonsoft solutions, R L FINE CHEM, CENTUM ELECTRONICE, PROVIMI, VENKTESWARA CLOTHING UNIT II.

Agriculture/farming
Crops like paddy, rice, and Raagi (millet) were being cultivated at a small scale in the area with irrigation from numerous lakes in the area. The villages surrounding Yelahanka, especially Allalasandra, were famous for Guava fruit and grapes. Alas, now agriculture and farming exist no more due to urbanization and industrialization.

Governmental research facilities exist around Yelahanka in the form of Gandhi Krishi Vigyana Kendra (GKVK) under the University of Agricultural Sciences www.uasbangalore.edu.in/ and Central Institute of Medicinal and Aromatic Plants (CIMAP – www.cimap.res.in) under Council of Scientific and Industrial Research (CSIR).

Education
There are many schools and colleges in Yelahanka. Schools in Yelahanka include Ryan International School,  Delhi Public School, Canadian International School, Bhavan's,  Chrysalis High, Presidency School, Poorna Pragna Education Centre

The Japanese Weekend School of Bangalore ( Bangarōru Nihonjin Hoshū Jugyō Kō), a Japanese weekend educational programme, serves Japanese nationals living in Bangalore. It holds its classes in the Canadian International School.

There are many technical education institutions in and around Yelahanka. Some of the prominent engineering colleges in the vicinity are REVA University, Sir M. Visvesvaraya Institute of Technology, BMS Institute of Technology, Brindavan College of Engineering, Nitte Meenakshi Institute of Technology, Sai Vidya Institute of Technology, Reva Institute of Technology and Management, HKBK College of Engineering and Sri Venkateshwara College of Engineering, Bangalore.

Vibgyor High School, has its 20th branch in Yelahanka.

Srishti Institute of Art Design and Technology, has six campuses across Yelahanka New Town.

White Petals School (WPS) is located in fourth Phase Yelahanka. It has been awarded as "Best Upcoming School" by Education Today.

Defence establishments
 The Indian Air Force has a presence in Yelahanka with an Air Force Station and a defence airport situated on NH7. An international air show is held every two years which attracts manufacturers and sellers of defence equipment, defence aircraft, and "next gen" fighters.
 The BSF (Border Security Force) has a training center in Yelahanka. The Special Operations Training center is located on NH7, towards the northern part of the suburb, on the road leading to BIAL.
 CRPF (Central Reserve Police Force) has a training school for their officers and troops at Yelahanka, with residential campuses for the troops. CRPF campus is located in a lush green environment on Doddaballapur Road.
 Karnataka State Reserve Police has its Training facility at Yelahanka. The academy is located in the northern part of the suburb, near the Air Force station.

References

 
 Government of Karnataka. City of Yelahanka. "Yelahanka City Municipal Council". Accessed 2 November 2005.

External links
Yelahanka Junction railway station
 
 Apartment in Yelahanka - Arvind Bel Air
 Business in Yelahanka - What's up Yelahanka

Neighbourhoods in Bangalore